Ghat may refer to:

 Ghat, a stairway leading up from a river in South Asia
 Burning ghat, a level area atop a riverbank ghat where Hindus cremate their dead
 Ghat, Libya, a town in Libya
 Ghāṭ, a term used in Assamese Vaishnava-Sattriya music for tabla or pakhawaj compositions
 Ghats, literally meaning slope mountains, the two mountain ranges of peninsular India which run parallel to the coastline are:
 Eastern Ghats, a mountain range along India's eastern coast
 Western Ghats, a mountain range along India's western coast

See also